Silene vulgaris, the bladder campion or maidenstears, is a plant species of the genus Silene of the family Caryophyllaceae. It is native to Europe, where in some parts it is eaten, but is also widespread in North America, where it is a common wildflower in meadows, open woods, and fields.

Gastronomy

The young shoots and the leaves may be used as food in some countries of the Mediterranean region. The tender leaves may be eaten raw in salads. The older leaves are usually eaten boiled or fried, sauteed with garlic as well as in omelettes.

Crete and Cyprus
In Crete it is called agriopapoula and the locals eat its leaves and tender shoots browned in olive oil.

In Cyprus it is very widely eaten, so much that it has, in recent years, come back into being cultivated and sold in shops in bunches. Two of the common Cypriot names are strouthouthkia and tsakrithkia.

Italy
In Italy the leaves of this plant may be used also as an ingredient in risotto. It is commonly known as sculpit, stridolo, or by the obsolete scientific name Silene inflata, as well as s-ciopetin, or grixol in Veneto, and nenkuz, or sclopit in Friuli and cojet in Piedmont.

Spain (La Mancha)
Formerly in La Mancha region of Spain, where Silene vulgaris leaves are valued as a green vegetable, there were people known as "collejeros" who picked these plants and sold them. Leaves are small and narrow, so it takes many plants to obtain a sizeable amount.

In La Mancha the Silene vulgaris leaves, locally known as "collejas", were mainly used to prepare a dish called gazpacho viudo (widower gazpacho). The ingredients were flatbread known as tortas de gazpacho and a stew prepared with Silene vulgaris leaves. Other dishes prepared with these leaves in Spain include "potaje de garbanzos y collejas", "huevos revueltos con collejas" and "arroz con collejas".

See also
List of plants with edible leaves
Castilian-Manchego cuisine

References

External links
Guisado de collejas
Arroz con collejas

vulgaris
Flora of Europe
Flora of temperate Asia
Flora of North Africa
Flora of Macaronesia
Saponaceous plants